Doe is the surname of:

 Benjamin Doe (born 1999), Liberian footballer
Brian Doe (1862–1941), Australian politician
 Charles Doe (1898–1995), American rugby union player.
 David Doe (born 2000), Canadian soccer player
 Donald Brian Doe (1920–2005), British archaeologist and architect
 Edward M. Doe (1850-1919), American jurist
 Francis Doe (born 1985), Liberian footballer
 Fred Doe (1864–1938), American baseball pitcher
 Samuel Gbaydee Doe (born 1966), peacebuilding and conflict analyst from Liberia
 Samuel Doe (1951–1990), president of Liberia 1980–1990
 John Doe or Jane Doe, a name used as a placeholder for an unknown or anonymous person, especially in a legal context
 Joseph Doe (1855–1925), American military officer, politician and baseball player.
 Janet Doe (1895–1985), medical librarian
 Michael Doe (businessman) (died 1990), British-Liberian businessman
 Michael Doe (bishop) (born 1947), British bishop
 Nancy Doe (born 1949), First Lady of Liberia
 Nicholas B. Doe (1786–1856), American politician
 Thomas Doe (1912–1969), American bobsledder
 William Doe (1941-2022), Australian professor